The 1952 The Citadel Bulldogs football team represented The Citadel, The Military College of South Carolina in the 1952 college football season.  J. Quinn Decker served as head coach for the seventh season.  The Bulldogs played as members of the Southern Conference and played home games at Johnson Hagood Stadium.

Schedule

References

Citadel Bulldogs
The Citadel Bulldogs football seasons
Citadel football